Dražen is a Serbo-Croatian masculine given name.

Drazen may also refer to:
Dražeň, a municipality and village in the Czech Republic
Drążeń, a village in Poland